Fort Spring is an unincorporated community and town in  Greenbrier County, West Virginia, United States. It is situated along the Greenbrier River within the Greenbrier River Watershed. It was once a substantial portion of the Chesapeake and Ohio railway by way of the Gravel Girtie route from Hinton in Summers County to Clifton Forge, Virginia. The name is derived from its main export; Mississippian limestone from Snowflake Quarry sent to Clifton Forge. The main road going through the small town was once the original rail line, but was moved.

Fort Spring was originally called "Mann's Ferry" and the community's current name refers to the old settler fort that has been lost to history. The rock cliff, or bluff, seen just prior to the primary two train tunnels when traveling eastward, was named 'Wilson's Bluff' due to a family settled there.  Colonel John Stuart, who shipped Ice Age sloth bones (Megalonyx jeffersonii) to Thomas Jefferson, noted the presence of saltpetre caves in the area.  The area is a combination of karst topography, riparian floodplain and ancient riverbeds with limestone (karst) outcropping mixing with farmlands and deciduous forest.  The only available drinking water is by drilled wells or cistern or transportation.

Due to recent West Virginia tourism promotions, Fort Spring is a known spot for setting down kayaks and other types of boats for day trips to the nearby town of Alderson.

See also
Greenbrier River

Greenbrier River Watershed Association

Sources 
 Jones, William K.  "The Karst Hydrology Atlas of West Virginia
 Jones, William K. "Hydrology of Limestone Karst." 1973
 McCue, J. B., Lucke, and Woodward, H.P., 1939, WVGES
 "Greenbrier County" 1939 United States Geological Survey
 "What is this Thing, Thomas Jefferson?"  Wilson, Marcia 2005 Unpublished Thesis

References

Unincorporated communities in Greenbrier County, West Virginia
Unincorporated communities in West Virginia
Coal towns in West Virginia